Coresoft is a video game developer based out of Lake Forest, California. The company was founded in June 1998. Coresoft has worked on platforms including the PlayStation, PlayStation 2, PS3, PSP, Wii, Xbox, Microsoft Windows, and iOS.

Games developed

References

External links
 
 Company summary from MobyGames
 Company summary from GameSpot
 Company summary from IGN

Video game companies of the United States
Video game companies established in 1998
1998 establishments in California
American companies established in 1998